Dublin City was an Irish borough constituency in the House of Commons of the United Kingdom of Great Britain and Ireland. It comprised the city of Dublin in the county of Dublin, and was represented by two Members of Parliament from its creation in 1801 until 1885.

In 1885, Dublin City was split into four divisions which were separate single member constituencies: Dublin College Green, Dublin Harbour, Dublin St Stephen's Green and Dublin St Patrick's.

Boundaries 

The city of Dublin was accounted a county of itself, although it remained connected with County Dublin for certain purposes. A Topographical Directory of Ireland, published in 1837, describes the Parliamentary history of the city:

The boundary was defined in the Parliamentary Boundaries (Ireland) Act 1832 as:

Members of Parliament

Elections
From 1832 (when registers of electors were first prepared) a turnout figure is given, for the percentage of the registered electors who voted. If the number of registered electors eligible to take part in a contested election is unknown, then the last known electorate figure is used to calculate an estimated turnout. If the numbers of registered electors and electors taking part in the poll are known, an exact turnout figure is calculated. In two member elections (in which an elector could cast one or two votes as he chose), where the exact number of electors participating is unknown, an estimated turnout figure is given. This is calculated by dividing the total number of votes cast by two. To the extent that electors used only one of their votes the estimated turnout figure is an underestimate.

Elections in the 1800s

Elections in the 1810s

Elections in the 1820s

Elections in the 1830s

 
 
 
 
 

 

 
 
 
 

 

On petition, Harty and Perrin were unseated, causing a by-election.

  
 
 
 

 

 
 
 
 

 

 
 
 
 

 

 On petition, O'Connell and Ruthven were unseated and Hamilton and West were declared elected on 16 May 1836

Elections in the 1840s

 
  

 

West's death caused a by-election.

 

 

  

 

 

On petition, the poll was amended and 92 votes were struck off Reynolds, although this did not cause him to be declared unelected.

Elections in the 1850s

Elections in the 1860s

 
  

 

Guinness' death caused a by-election.

Elections in the 1870s
On petition, Guinness was unseated.

Elections in the 1880s

Notes

References
The Parliaments of England by Henry Stooks Smith (1st edition published in three volumes 1844–50), 2nd edition edited (in one volume) by F.W.S. Craig (Political Reference Publications 1973)

External links
Part of the Library Ireland: Irish History and Culture website containing the text of A Topographical Directory of Ireland, by Samuel Lewis (a work published by S. Lewis & Co of London in 1837) including an article on the city of Dublin

Westminster constituencies in County Dublin (historic)
Constituencies of the Parliament of the United Kingdom established in 1801
Constituencies of the Parliament of the United Kingdom disestablished in 1885